Svetlana Komleva (born 15 December 1973) is a former professional tennis player from Moldova.

On 13 March 1995, she achieved a career-high singles ranking of world No. 132, and her best doubles ranking by the WTA was 158 on 7 August 1995.
Komleva won four tournaments in singles and six in doubles on the ITF Circuit.

She made her WTA Tour main-draw debut at the Austrian Open, in the doubles event partnering Tatjana Ječmenica.

Playing for Moldova Fed Cup team, she has a win–loss record of 8–2.

ITF finals

Singles: 6 (4–2)

Doubles: 13 (6–7)

References

External links
 
 
 

1973 births
Living people
Moldovan female tennis players
Soviet female tennis players